The Chiesa delle Anime Sante del Purgatorio or Church of the Holy Souls in Purgatory is a Roman Catholic church (or oratory) located on the Piazza Francesco Paolo Neglia and Via del Mercato in the town of Enna in Sicily, Italy. At a diagonal, across the street stands the church of San Tommaso.

History
In 1615–1616, permission to build a chapel or oratory dedicated for prayers of the (holy) Souls in Purgatory. Construction proceeded under the patronage of the Confraternity of the Anime Sante del Purgatorio. Construction of the present building only proceeded in 1671. The portal in pink stone was sculpted with baroque decoration and a split tympanum. The interior barrel vault is also richly decorated. The painter Guglielmo Borremans frescoed (1720-1723) the interior with depictions of the Glory with Madonna and Pope Urban VIII; Triumph of the Faith;  and a Defeat of the Rebel Angels. The main altarpiece depicts a Purgatory by the 19th-century local painter Saverio  Marchese. The 18th-century wooden pulpit is richly carved. The choir has a maiolica pavement.

References

 

Roman Catholic churches in Enna
17th-century Roman Catholic church buildings in Italy
Churches completed in 1671